"The Love She Found in Me" is a song written by Dennis Linde and Bob Morrison, and recorded by American country music artist Gary Morris.  It was released in April 1983 as the second single from the album Why Lady Why.  The song reached #5 on the Billboard Hot Country Singles & Tracks chart.

Charts

Weekly charts

Year-end charts

References

1983 singles
Gary Morris songs
Songs written by Dennis Linde
Song recordings produced by Paul Worley
Song recordings produced by Bob Montgomery (songwriter)
Warner Records singles
Songs written by Bob Morrison (songwriter)
1983 songs